Rein Eliaser (28 May 1885 Sangaste Parish, Kreis Dorpat – 14 October 1941 Sevurallag, Sverdlovsk Oblast) was an Estonian lawyer and politician. He was a member of IV and V Riigikogu. He was a member of the Riigikogu since 5 October 1931. He replaced Jakob Westholm.

In 1912, he married Anna Gailit, sister of author August Gailit. The couple had three children: Rein, Ruut and Elga.

References

1885 births
1941 deaths
People from Otepää Parish
People from Kreis Dorpat
Eastern Orthodox Christians from Estonia
Estonian People's Party politicians
National Centre Party (Estonia) politicians
Members of the Riigikogu, 1929–1932
Members of the Riigikogu, 1932–1934
University of Tartu alumni
Recipients of the Order of the White Star, 3rd Class
Estonian people who died in Soviet detention
People who died in the Gulag